The 2012 Cape Verdean Cup (Taça Nacional de Cabo Verde de 2012) season was the 5th competition of the regional football cup in Cape Verde. The season started on 11 August and finished with the cup final on 24 August. The cup competition was organized by the Cape Verdean Football Federation (Federação Caboverdiana de Futebol, FCF). Maio's Onze Unidos won their only title.

A total of 10 clubs participated. 10 played in the qualifying round, Paulense, Valência do Fogo and AD Bairro. Juventude do Norte did not play their match on August 18 which was with Sal's GD Palmeira, Palmeira was awarded an 0-3 win. Ultramarina of São Nicolau and Mindelo's Falcões do Norte directly qualified into group stage.

Its group stage consisted of two groups with three teams each (six total) and had two matches played. All remaining matches along with the final were played at Estádio Marcelo Leitão in Espargos, Sal.

No cup competitions took place from 2013 to 2017 due to financial, material and scheduling concerns, the next one would take place in 2018.

Participating clubs
Juventude do Norte, winner of the Boa Vista Island Cup
Juventude da Furna, winner of the Brava Island Cup
Valência FC do Fogo, winner of the Fogo Island Cup
Onze Unidos, winner of the Maio Island Cup
Juventude, winner of the Sal Island Cup
Boavista Praia, winner of the Santiago South Cup
Paulense, winner of the Santo Antão North Cup
Académica do Porto Novo, winner of the Santo Antão South Cup
FC Ultramarina, winner of the São Nicolau Cup
Batuque, winner of the São Vicente Cup

First round
10 clubs took part.

Group stage
Six clubs took part, three each in one of the two groups. This lasted for three days, each club had a bye week for the round. The club with the most points (sometimes a win or more or goals) qualified into the final.

Group A

Group B

Final

See also
2011–12 in Cape Verdean football
2012 Cape Verdean Football Championships

References

External links

Cape Verdean Cup seasons
1
Cape Verdean Cup